In geometry, a cissoid (() is a plane curve generated from two given curves ,  and a point  (the pole).

Slightly different but essentially equivalent definitions are used by different authors. For example,  may be defined to be the point so that  This is equivalent to the other definition if  is replaced by its reflection through .

Equations
However, because a point may be represented in multiple ways in polar coordinates, there may be other branches of the cissoid which have a different equation. Specifically,  is also given by 

So the cissoid is actually the union of the curves given by the equations 

For example, let  and  both be the ellipse

The first branch of the cissoid is given by 

which is simply the origin. The ellipse is also given by 

so a second branch of the cissoid is given by

which is an oval shaped curve.

and

then the cissoid relative to the origin is given by

Specific cases

Hyperbolas
Let  and  be two non-parallel lines and let  be the origin.

and

Combining constants gives

which in Cartesian coordinates is

This is a hyperbola passing through the origin. So the cissoid of two non-parallel lines is a hyperbola containing the pole. A similar derivation show that, conversely, any hyperbola is the cissoid of two non-parallel lines relative to any point on it.

Cissoids of Zahradnik
A cissoid of Zahradnik (named after Karel Zahradnik) is defined as the cissoid of a conic section and a line relative to any point on the conic. This is a broad family of rational cubic curves containing several well-known examples. Specifically:
 The Trisectrix of Maclaurin given by

is the cissoid of the circle  and the line  relative to the origin.

 The right strophoid

is the cissoid of the circle  and the line  relative to the origin.

 The cissoid of Diocles

is the cissoid of the circle  and the line  relative to the origin. This is, in fact, the curve for which the family is named and some authors refer to this as simply as cissoid.

 The cissoid of the circle  and the line  where  is a parameter, is called a Conchoid of de Sluze. (These curves are not actually conchoids.) This family includes the previous examples.
The folium of Descartes

is the cissoid of the ellipse  and the line  relative to the origin. To see this, note that the line can be written

and the ellipse can be written

So the cissoid is given by

which is a parametric form of the folium.

See also
Conchoid
Strophoid

References
 
 C. A. Nelson "Note on rational plane cubics" Bull. Amer. Math. Soc. Volume 32, Number 1 (1926), 71-76.

External links
 
 
 2D Curves

Curves
Algebraic curves

zh:蔓叶线